Abdinli (also, Abidinli, Abdınlı, Abdunly, and Abdynly) is a village in the Yardymli Rayon of Azerbaijan.  The village forms part of the municipality of Yeni Abdinli.

References

External links 
Satellite map at Maplandia.com 

Populated places in Yardimli District